Enobosarm, also known as ostarine or MK-2866, is an investigational selective androgen receptor modulator (SARM) developed by GTx, Inc. for the treatment of conditions such as muscle wasting and osteoporosis, formerly under development by Merck & Company.

Chemistry

According to a 2009 paper authored by GTx, "Readers are cautioned to note that the name ostarine is often mistakenly linked to the chemical structure of [S-4], which is also known as andarine. The chemical structure of ostarine has not been publicly disclosed." A 2009 review stated "Recently, GTx disclosed that compound 5 had advanced into clinical trials. The patent application described detailed data in an initial proof-of-concept Phase IIa clinical trial. It is not explicitly stated that compound 5 is Ostarine (MK-2866).

As of 2012, the mechanism of action of Enobosarm is still being debated and requires further investigation.

History
GTx Incorporated was founded in Memphis in 1997 and licensed rights to enobosarm from the University of Tennessee Research Foundation; the SARM compounds were invented by James T. Dalton, Duane D. Miller, Karen A. Veverka and their research teams at Ohio State University, the University of Tennessee and GTx, respectively.

By 2007, enobosarm was in a Phase II trial, and that year GTx signed an exclusive license agreement for its SARM program with Merck & Co.  The companies ended the deal in 2010.

In August 2011, there was a double-blind, placebo controlled phase II trial that focused on elderly men and postmenopausal women which concluded that Enobosarm showed statistically significant improvements in total lean body mass and physical function without the negative side effects that are normally present with steroids.

In August 2013, GTx announced that enobosarm had failed in two Phase III clinical trials to treat wasting in people with lung cancer.  The company had invested around $35 million in the development of the drug.  The company said at that time that it planned to pursue approval of enobosarm in Europe; the company was also still developing GTx-758 for castration-resistant prostate cancer.

In 2016, GTx began Phase II trials, to see if enosobarm might be effective to treat stress urinary incontinence in women.

In 2018, GTx announced the Phase II trials on Enobosarm's efficacy on stress urinary incontinence in women failed to achieve its primary endpoint in the ASTRID Trial.

Health effects
The FDA has warned that SARMs can have serious side effects ranging from risk of heart attack to stroke and liver damage.

Society and culture

Doping
SARMs including Enobosarm may be and have been used by athletes to assist in training and increase physical stamina and fitness, potentially producing effects similar to anabolic steroids. For this reason, SARMs were banned by the World Anti-Doping Agency in January 2008, despite no drugs from this class yet being in clinical use, and blood tests for all known SARMs have been developed. There are a variety of known cases of doping in sports with enobosarm by professional athletes.

In May 2017, Dynamic Technical Formulations voluntarily recalled all lots of Tri-Ton, a dietary supplement that the USFDA tested and found to contain Enobosarm and andarine.

In October 2018, UFC fighter Sean O'Malley tested positive for Enobosarm and was suspended by the Nevada State Athletic Commission and USADA for six months. O'Malley tested positive again on May 25, 2019 and was suspended for nine months by the same agencies. USADA determined that none of O'Malley's positive tests were consistent with intentional use and he was allowed to compete at UFC 248 as long as he kept his levels below the threshold of 100 ng/ml.

On January 7, 2019, the College National Football Championship was played between University of Alabama and Clemson University. Prior to the College Football National Championship game, three Clemson players who were Dexter Lawrence, Braden Galloway and Zach tested positive for a substance known as Enobosarm (ostarine). On June 23, 2019 Clemson did not release ostarine investigation findings, citing privacy law.

In July 2019, National Football League player Taylor Lewan failed a drug test for Enobosarm, which Lewan claimed he ingested accidentally as an unlabeled ingredient in a supplement.

On October23, 2020, the Union Cycliste Internationale (UCI) announced that the Italian rider Matteo Spreafico has been notified of two adverse analytical findings (AAFs) for Enobosarm in two samples collected during the Giro d’Italia on 1516 October 2020.

On July6, 2021, during the 2020 Summer Olympics, Brazil women's national volleyball team player Tandara was temporarily suspended for testing positive for Ostarine. The test was carried out and identified by the Brazilian Doping Control Authority (ABDC).

On August12, 2021, after the 2020 Summer Olympics, Chijindu "CJ" Ujah, A member of the silver medal-winning British 4×100 relay team was temporarily suspended for testing positive for both Ostarine and S-23. The sample was collected post event by the International Testing Agency (ITA) and confirmed two days later as positive. The case was referred to the anti-doping division of the Court of Arbitration for Sport. Finally in February 2022, Great Britain were stripped of their silver medal. In October 2022, Ujah was suspended for 22 months by the ITA.

In October 2021, two Thoroughbred horses named Arafat and Komunist tested positive for ostarine after races at Woodbine Racetrack.  In a decision of the Alcohol and Gaming Commission of Ontario issued May 30, 2022, the horses were declared unplaced in the races in question, and their trainer Robert Gerl was fined $100,000 (as well as forfeiting prize money) and suspended from racing for 20 years.

In May 2022, National Football League Wide Receiver DeAndre Hopkins was suspended six games without pay by the NFL for violating the league's performance-enhancing drug policy. According to Hopkins, he tested positive for ostarine.

Wider use
In recent years, ostarine and related substances have increasingly become used by the general public as "gym supplements"  such as pre-workout or lifestyle drugs, rather than as an aid to performance in athletic or bodybuilding competitions. In 2018, analysis of a fatberg from a sewer in central London showed ostarine to be the most abundant pharmaceutical drug detected, and was present at higher concentration than recreational drugs such as MDMA and cocaine. While this isolated result may not be representative of overall levels of use, for ostarine to be detectable in sewer deposits reflects significant levels of ostarine use in the area close to where the sample was collected.

See also 
 List of investigational sex-hormonal agents § Androgenics

References 

Acetanilides
Tertiary alcohols
Nitriles
Phenol ethers
Selective androgen receptor modulators
Trifluoromethyl compounds